La Di Da Di is the third studio album by American experimental rock band Battles, released on September 18, 2015 on Warp Records. It is the band's last album with guitarist/bassist Dave Konopka before his departure in 2018.

Recording
La Di Da Di is Battles' only album without vocals. Guitarist Dave Konopka said: "To me, vocals are like this fourth instrument that is totally insignificant in a band like Battles because we kind of have nothing to say and out of the three of us none of us are capable of really singing. The decision to not have vocals is more of a self-sufficient, functional decision than anything. I love plenty of bands with vocals, don’t get me wrong. When it applies to us and the chemical makeup of Battles it’s just inexplicable."

Critical reception

La Di Da Di received mostly positive reviews from contemporary music critics. At Metacritic, which assigns a normalized rating out of 100 to reviews from mainstream critics, the album received an average score of 73, based on 30 reviews, which indicates "generally favorable reviews".

Track listing

Personnel
Battles
 Dave Konopka – bass, guitar, effects
 John Stanier – drums
 Ian Williams – guitar, keyboards

Production
 Battles – producer
 Keith Souza – producer, mixer
 Seth Manchester – producer, mixer
 Greg Calbi – mastering
 Dave Konopka – art direction
 Warp Music – publisher

Charts

References

2015 albums
Battles (band) albums
Warp (record label) albums